South Otselic Historic District is a national historic district located at South Otselic in Chenango County, New York. The district includes 60 contributing buildings. It encompasses the hamlet's historic core and includes commercial, residential, ecclesiastical, and industrial buildings.  Among the notable buildings are the Methodist Church (ca. 1867), Gladding Corporation factory and office (1895), J. Brown Grist Mill (ca. 1810), Noonan's Blacksmith Shop (1870), Cox Block (1890, destroyed by fire on December 14, 2014), and Dew Drop Building (now post office, 1896).  Notable residences include the Octagon House (ca. 1860) and the Queen Anne style Former Gladding Mansion (ca. 1880).

It was added to the National Register of Historic Places in 1983.

The Cox Block built in 1890 burnt to the ground on December 14, 2014. After a grease fire started in one of the first floor apartments.

See also
National Register of Historic Places listings in Chenango County, New York

Gallery

References

External links

Historic districts on the National Register of Historic Places in New York (state)
Historic districts in Chenango County, New York
National Register of Historic Places in Chenango County, New York